Stromberg is a German mockumentary comedy television series which is produced by Brainpool and broadcast on the commercial television channel ProSieben. The series stars Christoph Maria Herbst as Bernd Stromberg and is written mainly by Ralf Husmann. It has become one of the most popular comedy shows in German-speaking countries and was honored with many awards such as the Deutscher Fernsehpreis. Its success also spawned other media such as a book and a feature film.

Stromberg marks one of the first international adaptations of the British TV series The Office, preceding the American counterpart by a year while at the same time sparking a copyright dispute with the BBC. Furthermore, the German equivalent is a more loose adaptation than most other international versions of the show (e.g. it takes places at an insurance company).

Synopsis 
The show takes place at the office of the fictional insurance company "Capitol Versicherung AG", (Capitol Insurance PLC) where the trivial day-to-day events take place in an eerie atmosphere oscillating between bullying and sycophancy.

Cast
 Christoph Maria Herbst as Bernd Stromberg
 Bjarne Mädel as Berthold "Ernie" Heisterkamp
 Oliver Wnuk as Ulf Steinke
 Diana Staehly as Tanja Steinke (* Seifert)
 Martina Eitner-Acheampong as Erika Burstedt
 Lars Gärtner as Timo Becker
 Tatjana Alexander as Tatjana Berkel
 Sinan Akkus as Sinan Turculu
 Maja Beckmann as Sabine "Sabbel" Buhrer
 Simon Licht as Hans-Jürgen Wehmeyer
 Peter Rütten as Mr. Pötsch
 Milena Dreißig as Jennifer Schirrmann
 Laurens Walter as Lars Lehnhoff
 Angelika Richter as Nicole Rückert
 Walter Gontermann as Dr. Heinemann
 Frank Montenbruck as Frank Montenbruck
 Joe Henselewski as Josef Müller
 Rita Winkelmann as Rita Klüver
 Prashant Prabhakar as Prashant Kumabandhu
 Stefan Lampadius as Steffen Lambert
 Nadja Becker as Maja Decker
 Dorothea Förtsch as Dorothea Förtsch
 Andreas Hermann as Andreas Hermann
 Suzanne Landsfried as Mrs. Landsfried
 Ralf Husmann as Hans Schmelzer
 Michaela Caspar as Frau Papenacker

Episodes

Broadcast 
The first season, which appeared in 2004, was made up of eight episodes. A second season of ten episodes, although not initially planned, was launched on 11 September 2005. A third season of eight episodes was launched on 5 March 2007. A fourth season was launched on 3 November 2009, with the entire season being available on DVD on 6 November. In 2011, a fifth season of Stromberg was aired and concluded in January 2012.

In 2021 small TV spots were produced to support the German vaccination campaign against COVID-19, with Stromberg as sceptical towards the vaccination who has to be convinced.

Copyright controversy 
The series was proclaimed to be a copy of the BBC series The Office, although initially the producers claimed it was based on a character from a past ProSieben comedy, despite many elements resembling The Office. An "inspired by" credit was given to the creators of The Office, Ricky Gervais and Stephen Merchant, after the BBC threatened ProSieben with legal action.

Book 
In 2007, the success of the show spawned the mock Chef - Deutsch / Deutsch - Chef. Klartext am Arbeitsplatz ("Boss-German/German-Boss: Straight Talk at Work"). It was published under the advertising pseudonym of "Bernd Stromberg" by German dictionary publishing company Langenscheidt shortly before the third season. The book became a bestseller in Germany and topped the non-fiction charts of Der Spiegel.

Film 
In December 2011, €1 million was collected by crowd funding to create a Stromberg feature film . Production started in early 2013 according to producer Ralf Husmann. Stromberg – Der Film ("Stromberg – The Movie") was released in cinemas in Germany on 20 February 2014,. The film was the highest-grossing film in Germany in the first two weeks after its release.

References

External links
 
 Official website of the German version
 Stromberg - News / Spoiler
 Watch season 1 online
 Watch season 2 online
 Watch season 3 online
 Watch season 4 online
 Watch season 5 online

The Office
German comedy television series
2004 German television series debuts
ProSieben original programming
2012 German television series endings
German-language television shows
Grimme-Preis for fiction winners
German television series based on British television series
Television shows involved in plagiarism controversies
Television series by Banijay